Events in the year 1888 in Germany, the 'Year of the Three Emperors'.

Incumbents

National level
 Kaiser – William I to 9 March, then Frederick III to 15 June, then Wilhelm II
 Chancellor – Otto von Bismarck

State level

Kingdoms
 King of Bavaria – Otto of Bavaria
 King of Prussia – William I to 9 March, then Frederick III to 15 June, then Wilhelm II (all Kaisers of the German Empire)
 King of Saxony – Albert of Saxony
 King of Württemberg – Charles I of Württemberg

Grand Duchies
 Grand Duke of Baden – Frederick I
 Grand Duke of Hesse – Louis IV
 Grand Duke of Mecklenburg-Schwerin – Frederick Francis III
 Grand Duke of Mecklenburg-Strelitz – Frederick William
 Grand Duke of Oldenburg – Peter II
 Grand Duke of Saxe-Weimar-Eisenach – Charles Alexander

Principalities
 Schaumburg-Lippe – Adolf I, Prince of Schaumburg-Lippe
 Schwarzburg-Rudolstadt – George Albert, Prince of Schwarzburg-Rudolstadt
 Schwarzburg-Sondershausen – Karl Günther, Prince of Schwarzburg-Sondershausen
 Principality of Lippe – Woldemar, Prince of Lippe
 Reuss Elder Line – Heinrich XXII, Prince Reuss of Greiz
 Reuss Younger Line – Heinrich XIV, Prince Reuss Younger Line
 Waldeck and Pyrmont – George Victor, Prince of Waldeck and Pyrmont

Duchies
 Duke of Anhalt – Frederick I, Duke of Anhalt
 Duke of Brunswick – Prince Albert of Prussia (regent)
 Duke of Saxe-Altenburg – Ernst I, Duke of Saxe-Altenburg
 Duke of Saxe-Coburg and Gotha – Ernst II, Duke of Saxe-Coburg and Gotha
 Duke of Saxe-Meiningen – Georg II, Duke of Saxe-Meiningen

Colonial Governors
 Cameroon (Kamerun) – Eugen von Zimmerer (1st term) to 17 January, then Julius Freiherr von Soden (2nd term)
 German East Africa (Deutsch-Ostafrika) – Karl Peters (administrator) to 8 February, then Hermann Wissmann (commissioner) (1st term)
 German New Guinea (Deutsch-Neuguinea) – Georg Freiherr von Schleinitz to 1 March, then Reinhold Kraetke (both Landeshauptleute of the German New Guinea Company)
 German South-West Africa (Deutsch-Südwestafrika) – Heinrich Ernst Göring (acting commissioner)
 Togoland – Jesko von Puttkamer (acting commissioner) (1st term) to 17 October, then Eugen von Zimmerer (commissioner)
 Wituland (Deutsch-Witu) – Gustav Denhardt (resident)

Events
9 March – Emperor Wilhelm I dies at the age of 90 in Berlin. He is succeeded by his oldest son Friedrich Wilhelm, who becomes Friedrich III.
16 April – The German Empire annexes the island of Nauru
15 June – Wilhelm II becomes German Emperor after the death of his father, Friedrich III.
13 December – Heinrich Hertz presents his report on the discovery of electromagnetic radiation to the Berlin Academy of Sciences

Literature
'Theses on Feuerbach' by Karl Marx is published posthumously

Music
Johannes Brahms – Violin Sonata in D Minor (opus 108)
Max Reger – String Quartet in D minor (with double bass obbligato; without op.) (1888–89)
Joseph Rheinberger — Organ Sonata No. 12 in D-flat, Op. 154
Richard Strauss
Don Juan, Macbeth (first version)
Carl Maria von Weber's opera Die drei Pintos completed posthumously by Theodor Hell

Sport
Establishment of association football clubs BFC Germania, TGM SV Jügesheim and KBC Duisburg

Miscellaneous
First buildings of the Berufsgenossenschaftliches Universitätsklinikum Bergmannsheil opened

Births

Deaths

References

 
Years of the 19th century in Germany
Germany
Germany